Frank Russell (May 8, 1921 – January 1984), nicknamed "Junior", was an American Negro league infielder in the 1940s.

A native of Nashville, Tennessee, Russell made his Negro leagues debut in 1943 with the Baltimore Elite Giants. He served in the United States Army during World War II. After returning from his service, Russell rejoined the Elite Giants for the 1946 and 1948 seasons. He died in Nashville in 1984 at age 62.

References

External links
 and Seamheads

1921 births
1984 deaths
Baltimore Elite Giants players
Baseball players from Nashville, Tennessee
United States Army personnel of World War II
20th-century African-American sportspeople
Baseball infielders
African Americans in World War II
African-American United States Army personnel